Naval Reserve Center, Chicopee is a former United States Navy reserve center located in Chicopee, Massachusetts. It was closed per the recommendations of the 1995 Base Realignment and Closure Commission, and consolidated to Naval Reserve Center, Quincy.

See also
 List of military installations in Massachusetts

References

Installations of the United States Navy in Massachusetts
Chicopee, Massachusetts
Military installations closed in the 1990s
Closed installations of the United States Navy